Pennsylvania elected its members October 8, 1816.

See also 
 1816 Pennsylvania's 9th congressional district special election
 1817 Pennsylvania's 10th congressional district special election
 1816 and 1817 United States House of Representatives elections
 List of United States representatives from Pennsylvania

Notes

References 

1816
Pennsylvania
United States House of Representatives